Feijao is derived from feijão, the Portuguese word for bean. It most commonly refers to:

 Feijoa sellowiana, a fruit also known as guavasteen or pineapple guava
 Phaseolus vulgaris, the common bean